Crown Point Courthouse Square Historic District is a historic district in Crown Point, Indiana, that dates back to 1873. It was listed on the National Register of Historic Places in 2004. Its boundaries were changed in 2005, and it was increased in 2007 to include a Moderne architecture building at 208 Main Street. The late nineteenth- and early twentieth-century commercial and public buildings represent a period of economic and political growth. The Lake County Courthouse stands in the center of the district. Designed by architect John C. Cochrane in 1878, this brick building is a combination of Romanesque Revival and Classical styles. Enlarged in 1909 with the addition of north and south wings, designed by Beers and Beers. Continued growth in the county required second enlargement in 1928. This local landmark was placed in the National Register of Historic Places in 1973.

The commercial buildings surrounding the courthouse include examples of the most common styles of the late nineteenth century. The I.O.O.F. Building and the commercial buildings at 103 West Joliet Street and 102 South Main Street are Italianate Commercial with decorative pressed-metal details. The Allman Block is the Romanesque Revival style on the square. These structures were built from 1880 to 1891.

The early twentieth-century architecture include the 1908 Carnegie Library  and the Masonic Lodge next to each other on South Main. The Masonic Lodge is a Colonial Revival-style building built c. 1920. Across Main Street are two other examples of the Colonial Revival, the Lake County Criminal Court Building and the Community Center, also from the 1920s.

The Lake County Sheriff's House and Jail, built in 1882, is Second Empire style. These are the first permanent buildings for this purpose. The jail was expanded in 1910. The bulk of the existing two-story building was completed in 1934. This is the jail from which John Dillinger escaped in March 1934 while being held on murder charges. The jail was closed in 1974 and placed in the National Register of Historic Places in 1989.

Significant Buildings

All structures are historically contributing towards the Historic District Status, unless otherwise noted.  An ‘O’ rating signifies that the structure had enough historic or architectural significance to be considered for individual listing in the National Register of Historic Places.  The ‘N’ rating signifies that the structure is above average and may, with further investigation be eligible for an individual listing.  The ‘C’ or contributing rating signifies that the structure meet the basic inventory qualifications, but fails to meet individual merit, but in combination with other closely placed similar structures warrants inclusion in an historic district.

Clark St (North Side)
106  Commercial Bldg, Vernacular c. 1890.
Joliet St (South Side)
115 Commercial Bldg, Vernacular c. 1920
113 Commercial Bldg, Vernacular c. 1900
111 Commercial Bldg, Minas Bldg c. 1937
107 Commercial Bldg, I.O.O.F, Italianate c. 1880 (N) 
105 Commercial Bldg, Italianate 1878
103 Commercial Bldg, Italianate 1878
Hark Court (South Side)
105-107 Commercial Bldg, Vernacular, c. 1900
North Court St (West Side)
1 Commercial Bldg, Vernacular, c. 1890
5 Commercial Bldg, Italianate, c. 1890
9 Commercial Bldg, Vernacular, c. 1920
13 Commercial Bldg, Vernacular, c. 1920
15 Commercial Bldg, Vernacular, c. 1920
19 Theater, Art Deco, c. 1940
21 Stan-Register Paper Building, Vernacular, c. 1910
103 Community Center, Colonial Revival, c. 1925
105 Solon Robinson Historical Marker, 1834
South Main St (West Side)
 Crown Point Carnegie Library Historical Marker, 1908
223 Crown Point Carnegie Library, Colonial Revival, 1908
225 Masonic Temple, Colonial Revival, c. 1920 (N) 
209-211 Commercial Bldg, Vernacular, 1930
99 Lake County Courthouse
 Lake County Courthouse Historical Marker, 1874North Main St (West Side)1 Allman Block, Romanesque Revival, 1891, (Amos Allman Building)(N) 
103-105 Commercial Bldg., Vernacular, c. 1920
113 Commercial Bldg, Italianate, 1896
116 Commercial Bldg, Vernacular, c. 1910South Main St (East Side)Lake County Sheriff's House & Jail Historical Marker, 1882
212 Lake County Sheriff's House, Second Empire, 1882 (O) 
230 Lake County Criminal Court, Colonial Revival, c. 1920 (O) 
208-210 Commercial Bldg, Vernacular, c. 1900
204 Commercial Bldg, Vernacular, c. 1920
138 Bank, Neoclassical, c. 1915 (O) 
136-132 Commercial Bldg, Italianate, 1878 (N) 
120 Commercial Bldg, Italianate, 1881
112 Commercial Bldg, Italianate, c. 1880
110 Commercial Bldg, Gable-front, c. 1860
108 Commercial Bldg, Vernacular, c. 1910
102 Commercial Bldg, Italianate, c. 1880
100 Commercial Bldg, Italianate, c. 1880North Main St (East Side)108-110 Commercial Bldg, Vernacular, c. 1890
116 Bastiani Building, Vernacular 1926South East St (West Side)'''
213 Lake County Jail, Vernacular, 1934, (O) NR
211 Industrial Bldg, Vernacular, c. 1930

References

Historic districts on the National Register of Historic Places in Indiana
Second Empire architecture in Indiana
Italianate architecture in Indiana
National Register of Historic Places in Lake County, Indiana
Courthouses on the National Register of Historic Places in Indiana
1873 establishments in Indiana